Thani bin Jassim bin Muhammed Al Thani (1856–1943) was the sheikh of Al Gharafa. His father, Jassim bin Mohammed Al Thani, from the ruling al Thani family, was the ruler of Qatar.

External links
شجرة آل ثاني

1856 births
1943 deaths
Thani bin Jassim
Sons of monarchs